Dabbeghatta is a small village in Mandya district of Karnataka state, India.

Location
Dabbeghatta is located on the road between Kikkeri and Holenarasipura. The village has good water resources, and the Hemavati River flows through the village.

Transportation
Mandagere Railway Station is one kilometer away from Dabbeghatta. Passenger trains between Mysore-Hassan-Shivamoga stop here.

See also
 Kikkeri
 Krishnarajapete
 Holenarasipura
 Mandagere

Gallery

References

Villages in Mandya district